Shekhawati is a semi-arid historical region located in the northeast part of Rajasthan, India. The region was ruled by Shekhawat Rajputs.
Shekhawati is located in North Rajasthan, comprising the districts of Jhunjhunu, 
parts of Sikar that lies to the west of the Aravalis and Churu. It is bounded on the northwest by the Jangladesh region, on the northeast by Haryana, on the east by Mewat, on the southeast by Dhundhar, on the south by Ajmer, and on the southwest by the Marwar region. Its area is 13784 square kilometers.

In the 17th to 19th centuries, Marwari merchants constructed grand havelis in the Shekhawati region. Steeped with wealth and affluence, the merchants attempted to outdo others by building more grand edifices – homes, temples, and step wells which both inside and outside were richly decorated  with painted murals.

Etymology of Shekhawati

Shekhawati was first mentioned in the book Bankidas ki Khyat. A contemporary of Bankidas was Colonel W.S. Gardener, who used the word Shekhawati in 1803. Later James Tod wrote the first history of Shekhawati. The term Shekhawati was used frequently in Vamsh Bhaskar. Shekhawati is named after Rao Shekha.

History

Ancient history

Many historians have considered this region included in the Matsya kingdom. Rigveda also provides certain evidences in this matter. Manusmriti has called this land as 'Brahmrishi Desha'.

Shekhawati region was included in 'Marukantar Desha' up to the Ramayana period. Out of 16 mahajanapadas prior to Buddha, only two Janapadas, namely Avanti and the Kingdom of Virata, were counted in the Rajasthan area. This region was also influenced by Avanti but later on Nandas of Magadha defeated Avanti. Historians believe that Mauryas obtained the Rajasthan from Nandas.

In ancient times Shekhawati was not limited to the present two districts.  During the Mahabharata period, it was known as Matsya Kingdom and extended to the Sarasvati River. Matsya Kingdom was founded by King Matsya (named Matsya because he was born from a apsra living as a fish), Son of King Uparichara Vasu. During ancient times this region was divided into several janapadas. Dhosi Hill, the revered hill bordering Haryana and famous for Chyavana Rishi's Ashram, as well as the place where Chyawanprash was formulated for the first time, has extensive mentions in the epic Mahabharat in Vanparv.

After the collapse of the Gupta dynasty, The Shekhawati  was controlled by the Chauhan Rajputs. Some parts of Shekhawati, Jhunjhunu, Fatehpur, and Narhar were taken from them by Kaimkhanis which in turn were defeated by Shekhawat Rajputs.

Kaimkhani is a branch emerging from the Chauhans. The first progenitor of Kaimkhanis was Karamchand, born in the family of Moterao of Chauhan clan, the ruler of Dadrewa. Firuz Shah Tughluq converted him to Islam and named him Kaimkhan. Thus his descendants are called Kaimkhani.

Shekhawat rule

Shekhawati was established and ruled by Shekhawat Rajputs until India's independence.

Rao Shekha from Dhundhar established his own independent kingdom with the capital at Amarsar. He was the first independent ruler. After him, Rao Raimal, Rao Suja, and Rao Lunkaran become the rulers of Amarsar. Rao Manohar succeeded his father Rao Lunkaran and founded Manoharpur later renamed Shahpura (The present ruler of Shahpura is the Tikai of Shekhawat subclan). Shekhawats conquered the Jhunjhunu, Fatehpur, Narhar of Kaimkhanis and established their rule in 1445 and ruled till 1614.

Thikanas of Shekhawati

Rao Shekha, a Shekhawat Rajput (sub-branch of Kachhwaha ), was the founder of Shekhawati, who originally divided Shekhawati into 33 Thikana (also called a Pargana), each with at least a kutcha mud fort, some of which were fortified further with stone. Many Thikanas had their own flags and emblems. Shekhawats ruled over the largest number of Thikanas in Jaipur Rajwara.

Alphabetical list of original 33 Thikana is as follows:
 Baloda Thikana was granted to Raj Shree Thakur Dalel Singh ji Shekhawat with 12 village jagir, who migrate from Pilani fort. Who was son of raj Shree Thakur Nawal Singhji Shekhawat of Nawalgarh and grandson of Jhunjhunu maharaja shree Shardul Singh ji Shekhawat. In first Raj shree thakur Dalel Singh ji Shekhawat established Pilani and built Dalelgarh fort in Pilani. Thakur Dalel Singh Ji was granted Pilani and Baloda with 12 villages. He was brave and perfect warriors during his lifetime he fought mandan war in 1832, after some time they migrated in Baloda thikana and handed over Baloda thikana with 12 other village jagir. Raj shree Thakur Dalel Singh ji Shekhawat was the first jagirdar/thikanedar of Baloda thikana. Shekhawats of Baloda thikana are of Bhojraji clan and Shardulsinghot subclan.
 Bissau Thikana, Bissau and Surajgarh merged to form Bissau
 Dundlod Thikana
 Hameerpura was granted to Gulab Singh; his descendants are called Rao ji ka.
 Jhunjhunu Thikana
 Khachariawas Thikana was granted to Raja Raisal's eldest son Lal Singh. As Akbar called Lal Singh the Lad Khan, this name became famous, and his descendants are known as Ladkhani. Khatu Thikana was granted to Raja Raisal's second son Kesari Singh.
 Kansarda Thikana was granted to Kanak Singh.
 Khandela Thikana
 Khatushyamji Thikana
 Khetri Thikana
 Loharu Thikana was the 33rd Thikana, which was granted to Arjun Singh, who constructed a kutcha mud fort there in 1570, which was converted to a pucca fort in 1803.
 Mandawa Thikana
 Mandela Thikana
 Mukundgarh Thikana
 Mundru Thikana
 Khelna
luharu
Indrapura Ratnawat clan,Churu
 Nangali Saledi Singh Thikana was granted by Rao Bhojraj to his youngest son Saledi Singh Shekhawat.
 Nawalgarh Thikana
 Parasrampura Thikana
 Pentalisa Thikana
 Pilani Thikana was granted Dalel Singh Shekhawat, third son of maharaja Mawal Singh's of Nawalgarh. Dalel Singh was granted Baloda and Pilani with 12 villagea. He built Dalelgarh fort in Pilani, and after some time he migrated to Baloda Thikana.
 Shahpura Thikana, was the head seat of Shekhawat clan. Shahpura was a Tazimi Thikana of Shekhawat sub-clan and was granted by Rao Shekha to his youngest son Rao Lunkaran.
 Sikar Thikana was granted to Maharaja Rao Tirmal and his descendants are known as Rao Ji ka.
 Surajgarh Thikana
 Tosham Thikana
 Udaipurwati Thikana was granted by Raja Rtisal to his fifth son Rao Bhojraj. Rao Bhojraj was the ancestor of the Bhojraj Ji Ka branch of Shekhawats. His descendants founded many Thikanas and ruled over them. The group of 45 villages of Udaipurwati was known as Pentalisa), which included Jhajhar, Gudha, Sultana (Rao Hathi Ram Singh ji ka), Bagholi, Khirod, etc.

Feudalism

Geography

Shekhawati is in the Thar Desert of Rajasthan and has special importance in the history of India. It also covers part of the Bagar tract along the Haryana-Rajasthan border.

The climate of the desert region is harsh and extreme. The summer brings hot waves of air called loo. Annual rainfall is at around 450 to 600  mm. The groundwater is as deep as 200 feet (60 m), and in some places, the groundwater is hard and salty. The people in the region depend on rainwater harvesting. The harvested rainwater from the monsoon season (during July and August) is stored in pucca tanks and used throughout the year for drinking purposes.

Major cities 

Major cities in Shekhawati include:

 Sikar district 
 Sikar 
 Fatehpur
 Reengus
 Sri Madhopur
  Jhunjhunu district
  Jhunjhunu
 Chirawa
 Nawalgarh
 Udaipurwati
 Pilani
 Khetri
 Churu district
 Churu
 Ratangarh
 Sardarshahar
 Taranagar
 Salasar

Culture, heritage, and tourism

Architecture

Shahpura Haveli is a 300-year-old palace built by Rao Pratap Singh, descendant of Rao Shekha, in the 17th century. In the zenana (women's quarters), various rooms offer different themes. Diwankhana, the formal drawing room, is decorated with family portraits and an array of antique armour. The Haveli was then renovated by Maharaj Surendra Singh and is now running as a Heritage Hotel. The haveli was recognized as one of the Historic Hotels in the World in the year 2018.

Havelis, temples and frescos

Most of the buildings of the Shekhawati region were constructed between the 18th century and the early 20th century. During the British occupation, traders adapted this style for their buildings. Shahpura Haveli in Shahpura, 65 km from Jaipur on Jaipur - Delhi Highway, and Nangal Sirohi in Mahendragarh district, 130 km from Delhi, are popular for their Shekhawati architecture within the National Capital Region (NCR).

Dress
Women wear ghagra lugdi as their traditional dress and men wear usual Rajasthani dress.
Shekhawati's women's dress is very costly and unique.

Language: Shekhawati dialect 

Shekhawati is a dialect of the Rajasthani language and is spoken by about three million speakers in the Churu, Jhunjhunu, and Sikar districts of Rajasthan. Even though it is a very important dialect from the grammatical and literary points of view, very little work is carried out on it. In 2001 a descriptive compendium of the grammar of Shekhawati was published. Shekhawati, like the Bagri dialect of Ganganagar and Hanumangarh districts, has a parallel lexicon which makes it very rich from a lexicographical point of view. Word order is typically SOV and there is the existence of implosives. The presence of high tone at the suprasegmental level classifies it with other dialects of Rajasthani. It has contributed significantly to the development of Rajasthani language and linguistics.

Some samples in Shekhawati are:
  , 'What happened?'
  , 'What are you doing?'
  , 'I will give you great respect.'
  , 'Where are you going?'
  , 'What are you eating?'
  , 'I don't know'

Agriculture

Education 
Recently, the Shekhawati region has shown immense growth in the education sector and has become one of the most successful belt in terms of merit results. There are many schools and colleges that have been established, which is the prime reason of the huge success the region is seeing. Shekhawati is even used for name keeping of the Institutes like Shekhawati Public School, Dundlod, Shekhawati Engineering college. There are many institutes named after Shekhawati. The Shekhawati region has the highest literacy in the state.

See also
 Rajasthani people

References

External links
Fatehpur
Ramgarh Shekhawati
World's largest Open-air Art Gallery

Further reading 
 Ranbir singh Shekhawat(DUNDLOD) History of Shekhawats,Jaipur,2001 
 Ghansyamdas Birla: Bikhare Vicharon ki Bharonti, New Delhi, 1978
 Rajasthan: the painted walls of Shekhavati, by Aman Nath and Francis Wacziarg. Vikas Publications, 1982. .

 
Cities and towns in Sikar district
Tourist attractions in Sikar district
Former principalities
Regions of Rajasthan
Thar Desert
Rajasthani architecture
Tourism in Rajasthan